Creamfields is a British Electronic dance music festival which takes place in Daresbury, Cheshire, and has operated since 1998. Below is a list of line-ups for the festival:

2011
Source:

Saturday

Sunday

2012
Source:

Saturday

Sunday

2013
Source:

Friday

Saturday

Sunday

2014
Source:

Saturday

Sunday

2015
Source:

Friday

Saturday

Sunday

2016
Source:

Thursday

Friday

Saturday

Sunday

2017
Source:

Thursday

Friday

Saturday

Sunday

2018
Source:

Thursday

Friday

Saturday

Sunday

2019
Source:

Friday

Saturday

Sunday

2020
The 2020 edition of Creamfields was cancelled due to the COVID-19 pandemic. Artists announced prior to the cancellation include:

Above & Beyond
Adam Beyer
Alesso
Andy C
ANNA
Armin van Buuren
Basement Jaxx [DJ set]
B. Traits
Ben Nicky
Bicep [live]
Boris Brejcha
Brennan Heart
Calvin Harris
CamelPhat
Carl Cox
Charlotte De Witte
Chase & Status [DJ set]
Cristoph
D‐Block & S‐Te‐Fan
Darren Styles
deadmau5
Denis Sulta
Dimitri Vegas & Like Mike
Disciples
Enrico Sangiuliano
Eric Prydz
Example
Ferry Corsten
FISHER
Gareth Emery
Gorgon City
Hannah Wants
Holy Goof
Hybrid Minds
Jamie Jones
Jauz
Jax Jones
Joseph Capriati
Kölsch
Laidback Luke
La Fleur
Marco Carola
Martin Garrix
MATTN
Michael Bibi
Miss K8
MK
Nina Kraviz
Oliver Heldens
Patrick Topping
Pendulum – TRINITY
Pete Tong
Sam Divine
Scooter
Simon Dunmore
Skream
Sound Rush
Sub Focus
Sub Zero Project
Sonny Fodera
Sven Väth
The Chainsmokers
Tiësto
Timmy Trumpet
Vini Vici
W&W
Wildstylez
Zatox

Notes

References

Creamfields